Ryan Bovell (born January 24, 1974) is a cricketer who plays for and captains the Cayman Islands national cricket team. He led the country to the 2007 ICC World Cricket League Division Three tournament in Darwin, Australia where the Cayman Islands  were eliminated at the semi-final stage, and to the 2005 ICC Intercontinental Cup which had first-class status.

References
ESPN Cricinfo
Cricket Archive

1974 births
Living people
Caymanian cricketers
Barbadian emigrants to the Cayman Islands